Brian Fitzsimons Milne (born January 7, 1973 in Waterford, Pennsylvania) is a former American football fullback in the National Football League. Being drafted in the fourth round of the 1996 NFL Draft by the Indianapolis Colts. He was placed on waivers before the season started, later to be claimed by the Cincinnati Bengals where he saw little action carrying the ball, logging only 125 yards and 4 touchdowns over 4 seasons in Cincinnati. He was then released by the Bengals and picked up by the Seattle Seahawks.

He last played for the New Orleans Saints with whom he was a part of play in the 2000 wild card playoff game against the St. Louis Rams, in which Milne recovered the muffed punt off Az-Zahir Hakim with less than 2 minutes left to help the Saints record their first ever playoff win. Saints announcer Jim Henderson made the call:

Milne had a career at Penn State University, where Head Coach Joe Paterno held a scholarship for Milne as he recovered from cancer treatments as a teenager. As a member of the Nittany Lions in early November 1994 at Illinois, he scored three touchdowns (including the game-winner) in a Penn State victory under Paterno. Penn State went on to beat Oregon in the Rose Bowl to become the first Big Ten team to earn a 12-0 record, finishing second in the polls.

While at Penn State, Milne was also a member of the track & field team.  He was a national class discus thrower.  Milne threw the 2k discus over 63m/207' for an American Junior Record.

Sources 

"Hakim Drops The Ball" on YouTube

1973 births
Living people
People from Waterford, Pennsylvania
Players of American football from Pennsylvania
American football fullbacks
Penn State Nittany Lions football players
Cincinnati Bengals players
Seattle Seahawks players
New Orleans Saints players
American male discus throwers